Tekeeua Tarati (born 12 April 1971 in Tamana) is an I-Kiribati politician and entrepreneur, Minister for Information, Communications, Transport and Tourism development since July 2020.

Managing Director of Triple Tee Enterprises (TTT), between 2006 and 2018 he served the Kiribati Chamber of Commerce & Industry (KCCI) as Secretary, Vice-President and President (2012-2016), for maximum terms.
When Matiota Kairo, the MP of Tamana, resigned in November 2018 for medical reasons, Tarati run for by-election and was elected in March 2019 at the Maneaba ni Maungatabu. He joined then the ruling party, Tobwaan Kiribati Party (TKP). In the following general election, in April 2020, he was re-elected with more than 86% of votes. He was then nominated as chairman of TKP until the presidential election of 22 June 2020.

References

Living people
Members of the House of Assembly (Kiribati)
People from the Gilbert Islands
21st-century I-Kiribati politicians
Government ministers of Kiribati
1971 births
Tobwaan Kiribati Party politicians